João Augusto Conrado do Amaral Gurgel was a Brazilian businessman. In 1969, he decided to start a small factory, producing small cars. Early models were fiberglass bodies installed on Volkswagen Beetle (fusca) chassis and machinery. Gurgel introduced Brazil's first domestically designed car, the BR-800, but went out of business in the 1990s. João do Amaral Gurgel was known as João Gurgel. He was the founder of Gurgel.

Bankruptcy
The real cause of João Gurgel's bankruptcy was very bad commercial decisions,  with new policies by the Brazilian government from March 1990. While under total protectionism (1969-1989), Gurgel had prosperity, having as much an important part of Brazilian Jeep's market. In the late 1980s, then Brazilian president José Sarney granted a large loan (without any collateral) to Gurgel, from a Brazilian state bank. He also got a special and low level of value tax to his small car, the Gurgel BR-800.(1)

The end for Gurgel began when president Fernando Collor went to office in March, 1990. Collor opened the Brazilian car market to foreign cars. Even though the import tax was 85%, the Gurgel Carajás was more expensive than Lada Niva, an SUV from then Soviet Union. The Gurgel's SUV's went out of the market. The last Gurgel Carajás was produced in January, 1991. In 1990, Fernando Collor also reduced the IPI (a Brazilian value tax) of Uno Mille to 20% and sent the same level of tax to Gurgel BR-800.(1)

Comparisons
By any measure, Fiat's Uno Mille, a 1000cc car, was more powerful and spacious than Gurgel BR-800. The price of both models was then similar. BR-800's sales dropped to almost nothing in 1990. In 1992, Gurgel launched a car based on Gurgel BR-800, the Gurgel Supermini. Like its similar model, the Supermini's sales were very low. Fernando Collor refused to grant a loan (without guarantees) of about US$80,000,000 from BNDES to Gurgel. Even so, Gurgel got two loans; both of them from state's governments. One from BEC (then bank of Brazilian state of Ceará) and other loan from Banespa - then bank of Brazilian state of São Paulo. Again, both loans didn't have any guarantee. Even with these generous loans, the Gurgel's sales remained very small. In fact, they didn't stop falling between 1990 and 1993. Just about 1,500 Supermini Gurgel's cars were produced, in 1992 and 1993.(1)

In 1995, Gurgel's final bankruptcy was decreed. Gurgel's assets were less than 3% of its debt. In fact, Gurgel's assets were not even enough to pay its former workers. The Brazilian site http://www.gurgelbrasil.com/GURGEL-Jornal-do-Carro_PAG1.htm claims that Gurgel's debt was about US$1,200,000,000. Between 1969 and 1993, Gurgel launched about 12 new vehicles. One of them was the first Brazilian electric car in commercial production, a complete commercial failure. With the sole exception of "Xavante X" and series produced mainly in 1970 decade, no Gurgel product had any commercial success. The "Tocantins" was transformed into "Gurgel Carajás". This vehicle was the leader in sales among off-road vehicles in Brazil, until 1990. Carajás "SUV" was so bad and expensive that when the importation of Lada Niva was authorized in 1990, by Fernando Collor, the Gurgel Carajás went out of production within a few months. Lada Niva got almost all Gurgel Carajás' market even though Lada Niva had to pay an import tax of 85% in 1990. Lada Niva was better and cheaper than Gurgel Carajás. Lada Niva also was a real 4 x 4 drive, while all Gurgel's SUV's were 4 x 2. The Gurgel BR-800 and Gurgel Supermini were both worse than Fiat's Uno Mille, far less spacious, powerful and more uncomfortable.(1)

In 1991, João Gurgel had one of his last ideas. The decided to start the Gurgel Delta a small car, for only two persons(4). His idea was to build plants in the States of Ceará and São Paulo, having both States as investment partners, inspired by the well succeeded example given by the partnership between the Italian carmaker Fiat and the State of Minas Gerais. Both State governments failed in providing the promised investments. Without resources, João Gurgel appealed to the Federal government, but the Brazilian President Fernando Collor refused to give loans of about US$80,000,000 from BNDES and US$25,000,000 from SUDENE. The terrible situation of his industry sent it to bankruptcy in 1994.

Controversy
Even today, João Gurgel remains with followers, claiming that he was sent to bankruptcy by politicians. Between 1976 and 1990 was out of law to import jeeps or in fact, any kind of vehicle in Brazil. Even, so in 1990, the tax to import a jeep in Brazil was about 85%. Until Gurgel's bankruptcy, Brazilian press gave all possible support to João Gurgel. In fact, he was flattered by Brazilian press and for more than twenty years. His vehicles were expensive, mainly because they were practically made by hand. The Brazilian press was always saying that João Gurgel would be the Brazilian Henry Ford of the future. João Gurgel was also a popular figure. In 1987-1988 he launched a crusade to get money from partners. Buying shares for something around US$4,500.00, the new shareholderes would be entitled to be the first owners of the new car that would be produced by his industry (BR-800 model). Those shareholders did indeed receive their BR-800 car.

João Gurgel was admired as a brilliant engineer, but not as a manager. The site Default claims that João Gurgel default was about US$1,200,000,000, in 1994. As a consequence of the bankruptcy, suppliers of parts of his small vehicles and even workers weren't paid.

In the middle 90's, João Gurgel was diagnosed with Alzheimer's disease. He died on January 30, 2009, always surrounded by his family, which lives in São Paulo. Another Brazilian, Paulo Emílio Lemos that never knew João Gurgel started a small factory of small agriculture's vehicles some years ago, also called Gurgel(2). Except the name and logo, the new "Gurgel" has nothing with the old Gurgel founded by this Brazilian businessman. Differently from João Gurgel's industry, the new "Gurgel" does not produce any single Brazilian vehicle, but merely resells Chinese products.

Sources
 Gurgel in English >Excellent site in English. It agrees 100% with this article.
 Photo >Site in Portuguese.
 Autocar >Another site in Portuguese.
 (1) Gurgel
 (2) New Gurgel
 (3)  >Interview in Portuguese.
 (4) Delta >Site in Portuguese.

1926 births
2009 deaths
20th-century Brazilian businesspeople
Deaths from dementia in Brazil
Deaths from Alzheimer's disease
People from Franca